Idoma is the second official language spoken in Benue State in southeast-central Nigeria, by approximately one million people (2020 estimate). The Idoma language is made up of the dialects of Agatu, Otukpo, Otukpa, Orokam, Akpa Agila, Utonkon, Igede, Etilo, Iyala. The Idoma people are predominantly hunters, farmers and fishermen. They are bordered to the north by Nasarawa, south by cross river, east by Taraba and west by Enugu and Kogi States.

Animal names

References

Idomoid languages